The Jāme Mosque of Urmia ( – Masjid-e-Jāmeh Orumieh) also known as, Rezayieh Mosque (Masjid-e-Rezayieh), is the grand, congregational mosque (Jāme) of Urmia, Iran. The mosque is situated in the older part of the city and was constructed in 13th century during the Ilkhanate era.

Gallery

See also
Holiest sites in Shia Islam

References

External links
 The pictures of Jameh Mosque of Urmia

Mosques in Iran
Buildings and structures in Urmia
13th-century mosques
Mosque buildings with domes
Urmia